Hukkaputki (Finglish Stranded streak) is a 32-episode Finnish sketch-satire comedy television show from the 1980s.

Actors
 Tuija Ahvonen
 Kristiina Halkola
 Kari Franck
 Erkki Saarela
 Jukka Sipilä
 Kari Sorvali
 Leena Uotila

External links
 
 YLE Elävä arkisto/Hukkaputki  

1980s satirical television series
Finnish television sketch shows